The 2003 Idaho Vandals football team represented the University of Idaho during the 2003 NCAA Division I-A football season. Idaho was a football-only member of the Sun Belt Conference, and played their home games in the Kibbie Dome, an indoor facility on campus in Moscow. The Vandals went  under head coach and alumnus Tom Cable, in his fourth and 

Prior to Cable's arrival in 2000, Idaho had just two losing seasons (1981, 1997) in two decades; he had four consecutive with a  record and was fired immediately after

Schedule

NFL Draft
One Vandal senior was selected in the 2004 NFL Draft, which lasted seven rounds (255 selections).

List of Idaho Vandals in the NFL Draft

References

External links
Gem of the Mountains: 2004 University of Idaho yearbook – 2003 football season
Idaho Argonaut – student newspaper – 2003 editions

Idaho
Idaho Vandals football seasons
Idaho Vandals football